The Paymaster General Act 1782 (22 Geo. 3. c. 81) was an Act of the Parliament of Great Britain. The Act abolished the practice of the heads of subordinate treasuries keeping large sums of public money for long periods, during which they employed them for their own profit. It was repealed by the Paymaster-General Act 1783.

Notes

Repealed Great Britain Acts of Parliament
Great Britain Acts of Parliament 1782